Antony and Cleopatra is a 1959 Australian television play based on the play by William Shakespeare.

It was broadcast live in Melbourne then recorded and screened in Sydney. The ABC also broadcast a production of Hamlet at the same time, which was broadcast live in Sydney then recorded and screened in Melbourne. It was the ABC's first live Shakespeare play.

Cast
Bettie Kauffman as Cleopatra
Keith Eden as Antony
Kevin Miles as Caesar
Laurier Lange as Lepidus
Edward Howell as Agrippa
Judith Godden as Charmain
Paul Bacon as Alexas
Beverly Dunn as Octavia
Frank Gatliff as Pompey
John Morgan as Menas
Keith Hudson as Eros
Alan Tobin as Procuecius
Colin Eaton as Soothsayer
Philip Stainton as Clown
Hugh McDermott as first messenger
George Ogilvie as second messenger
Alan Hopgood as first soldier
Alan Morley as second soldier
Ken Goodlet as Enobarus
Soula Paulay, R de Winter, Antonio Rodrigues and Albert la Guerre as Cleopatra's attendants
Nevil Thurgood, John Godfrey and Peter Diess as soldiers

Production
Arthur Chipper did the adaptation, which made a number of alterations from the play, including reducing the characters and opening it in Rome not Alexandria.

It was shot at ABC's studios in Rippon Lea. It used a cast of 24, 15 speaking parts, ten sets and 31 scenes. The set was designed by Jon Peters. It was Keith Eden's first performance as a "straight" actor on TV - he was better known as a radio actor. There were 31 scene changes. Keith Clarke did costumes.

Reception
"Janus", the TV critic for The Age thought the play was "not for television."

Another critic for the same paper said it "was a gallant and praiseworthy attempt in the face of heavy odds" but did not think the play suitable for television although he liked the two lead performances.

The Sydney Morning Herald critic wrote that:
Not much of the pomp and poetry came through the rich texture of Shakespeare's language in the... production.. although as a straightforward account of love and war this Melbourne performance Was satisfactory enough. Two things helped to lower the temperature of the love and the language; first, Arthur Chipper's rearrangement of the first half of the play was quite skillful, but the cutting was on a political rather than on a passionate bias, and second, producer Christopher Muir'_s use of cameras and- lighting did little—except in a few scenes — to imaginatively underline the play's mood, atmosphere, and growing tensions.
The Bulletin said "A satisfactory TV treatment of this play is probably impossible. Even more than Hamlet it cries out for space and color. Its conflicting worlds of politics and self-consuming passion are created in images of the utmost scope and vigor, and if a producer cannot match them in physical terms he must concentrate on the richness of the poetry and look continually for the points of tension between the two worlds."

See also
List of live television plays broadcast on Australian Broadcasting Corporation (1950s)

References

External links

1950s Australian television plays
1959 television plays
Films based on Antony and Cleopatra
Films directed by Christopher Muir